Dragon Lady is a 2019 Philippine television drama fantasy series broadcast by GMA Network. Directed by Paul Sta. Ana, it stars Janine Gutierrez in the title role. It premiered on March 4, 2019 on the network's Afternoon Prime and Sabado Star Power sa Hapon line up replacing Asawa Ko, Karibal Ko. The series concluded on July 20, 2019 with a total of 117 episodes. It was replaced by Hanggang sa Dulo ng Buhay Ko in its timeslot.

The series is streaming online on YouTube.

Cast and Characters 

Lead cast
 Janine Gutierrez as Celestina "Yna" Sanchez Chua-Chan / Scarlet Del Fuego

Supporting cast
 Tom Rodriguez as Michael Chan
 James Blanco as Bryan Atienza
 Diana Zubiri as Almira Sanchez-Atienza / Lavender Del Fuego
 Maricar de Mesa as Vera Lim-de Chua
 Joyce Ching as Astrid Lim de Chua / Astrid Lim Liu
 Edgar Allan Guzman as Goldwyn Chen
 Lovely Abella as Ginger Garcia
 DJ Durano as James Liu
 Aira Bermudez as Calista
 Odette Khan as Doray Orosco
 Raquel Villavicencio as Philippa Chua
 Julia Lee as Lotus Go
 Mika Gorospe as Julie

Guest cast
 Bea Binene as young Almira / Lavender 
 Kristofer Martin as young Bryan
 Derrick Monasterio as Charles Chua Jr.
 Isabelle de Leon as young Vera
 Denise Barbacena as young Ginger
 Leo Martinez as Wilson Lim
 Mosang as young Doray
 Carlene Aguilar as young Philippa
 JC Tiuseco as young James
 Lorenz Martinez as young Wilson
 Nicole Chan as young Lotus
 Stanley Abuloc as young Goldwyn
 Rafael Rosell as Matthew Chan
 Dexter Doria as Rebecca Chan
 Edicta Harteveld as young Yna / Scarlet
 Zachie Rivera as young Astrid
 Abel Napuran as Nando
 Carmen del Rosario as Ising
 Erlinda Villalobos as Nenita 
 Shermaine Santiago as Gigi
 Rob Moya as Diego
 Ge Villamil as Flora
 Jason Francisco as Jeff
 Marika Sasaki as Jopay
 Chariz Solomon as Tintin Mapagmahal
 Kiel Rodriguez as Onyx
 Candy Pangilinan as Mimi
 Elle Ramirez as Salve Miranda / Scorfiona
 Claire Castro as Shane
 Samantha Lopez

Ratings
According to AGB Nielsen Philippines' Nationwide Urban Television Audience Measurement People in television homes, the final episode of Dragon Lady scored a 7.8% rating.

Accolades

References

External links
 
 

2019 Philippine television series debuts
2019 Philippine television series endings
Fantaserye and telefantasya
Filipino-language television shows
GMA Network drama series
Television shows set in the Philippines